Monique Evans (born Monique Rezende Nery da Fonseca on July 5, 1956) is a Brazilian model, actress and television presenter. She was a participant on seasons third and fourth of A Fazenda.

A Fazenda
On September 28, 2010, Monique Evans was officially announced as one of the fifteen celebrities contestants on the third season of A Fazenda, the Brazilian version of reality series The Farm, which aired on Rede Record.

During her time in the farm she got involved in arguments with fellow contestants Dudu Pelizzari and Nany People. On October 4, 2010, after 10 days, she was the first celebrity to be evicted despite being one of the most notorious cast members of the bunch.

Monique got a second chance on July 19, 2011, when she was officially announced as one of the fifteen celebrities contestants on the fourth season of the show. This time, she went all the way to end, finished as runner-up to personal trainer and model Joana Machado after 87 days on October 12, 2011.

Personal life
In February 2015, Evans began a same-sex relationship with DJ Cacá Werneck, whom she met in 2014, in the psychiatric clinic where she was admitted for treat her depression.

Filmography

References

External links
Monique Evans Official website 
Monique Evans Profile on A Fazenda 3
Monique Evans Profile on A Fazenda 4
Monique Evans on EGO of Globo.com

1956 births
Living people
Bisexual women
Bisexual actresses
Actresses from Rio de Janeiro (city)
Brazilian television presenters
Brazilian female models
Brazilian LGBT entertainers
Brazilian LGBT actors
LGBT Christians
Brazilian evangelicals
The Farm (TV series) contestants
Brazilian women television presenters